This was the first edition of the tournament. The tournament was canceled after completion of play on September 28 due to the forecasted impacts of Hurricane Ian on South Carolina.

Seeds

Draw

Finals

Top half

Bottom half

References

External links
Main draw
Qualifying draw

LTP Men's Open - 1